Ida Rannveig Stuve Roggen (born 16 September 1978 in Oslo, Norway) is a Norwegian jazz singer, information officer, and literary scholar, and is the younger sister of jazz singer Live Maria Roggen and twin sister of Soprano Ane Carmen Roggen.

Career 
Roggen is well known in Norway after recording the album Pitsj (2006) at the studios of The Real Group, within the vocal group Pitsj, followed by participation in the competition «Kjempesjansen» at NRK together with Tora Augestad, Anine Kruse, Benedikte Kruse and her twin sister Ane Carmen. She also collaborated with the Norwegian rock band «CC Cowboys» on the album Innriss (2011).

Roggen is Information Adviser at University of Oslo.

Discography

Solo albums 
Within Pitsj
2006: Pitsj (Grappa Music)
2008: Edvard Grieg in jazz mood (Universal Music), with Kjell Karlsen ("I Dovregubbens hall")
2009: Gjenfortellinger (Grappa Music)
2014: Snow Is Falling (Grappa Music)

Collaborative works 
With «CC Cowboys»
2011: Innriss (Warner Music, Norway)

References

External links 
Pitsj Official website
Pitsj – plateslipp på Parkteateret at MIC.no, 2006 (in Norwegian)

Norwegian women jazz singers
University of Oslo alumni
Musicians from Oslo
1978 births
Living people
20th-century Norwegian women singers
20th-century Norwegian singers
21st-century Norwegian women singers
21st-century Norwegian singers
Pitsj members